Ambedkar Memorial Park, formally known as Dr. Bhimrao Ambedkar Samajik Parivartan Prateek Sthal, is a public park and memorial in Gomti Nagar, Lucknow, Uttar Pradesh, India. The memorial is dedicated to B. R. Ambedkar, the 20th century Indian polymath and the first law minister of India.

The park also honors the lives and memories of Jyotirao Phule, Narayana Guru, Birsa Munda, Shahuji Maharaj, and Kanshi Ram. The park also has 124 monumental elephants. The memorial was constructed by Mayawati, the former Chief Minister of Uttar Pradesh, during her administration when she led the Bahujan Samaj Party.

History

The foundation stone of the memorial was first laid in 1995. Earlier, the park was named Dr. Bhimrao Ambedkar Udyan. In 2002, it was renamed the Dr. Bhimrao Ambedkar Memorial and development work continued until 2002-03. In 2007, the park underwent further renovation and development. It was initially opened to the public on 14 April 2008 by Chief Minister Mayawati.

The entire memorial is built using red sandstone brought from Rajasthan. It is situated in the posh locality of Gomti Nagar, the largest planned residential colony in India. Cost of the memorial is estimated at 7 billion rupees. Its name was changed from Ambedkar Park to Bhimrao Ambedkar memorial in May 2012.

Features
There are several sites comprising the memorial park.

Ambedkar Stupa

This construction is the heart of the entire memorial. The sanctum sanctorum consists of many statues depicting the biography of Ambedkar. There are four doors in opposite directions. This is a construction in the shape of a flower bearing four petals. There is a bronze statue of Ambedkar seated in a chair, facing towards the two domes. The Ambedkar statue was modeled on the sculpture of Abraham Lincoln at the Lincoln Memorial in Washington.

At the base of the statue a message in Hindi reads:

Dr. Bhimrao Ambedkar Samajik Parivartan Sangrahalay
Opposite to the Dr. Bhimrao Ambedkar Memorial is the Sangrahalay (museum), constructed over an area of about 2.5 acre (11,008 sq.m.). The building has two domes on top. It contains large statues of Mahatma Jyotiba Phule, Rajarshi Chhatrapati Shahuji Maharaj, Shri Narayan Guru, Dr. Bhimrao Ambedkar and Shri Kanshiram. Another building consists of 18-foot tall marble statues of Tathagat Gautam Buddha, Sant Kabir Das, Sant Ravidas, Guru Ghasidas and Shri Birsa Munda.

Dr. Bhimrao Ambedkar Samajik Parivartan Gallery
Constructed in an area of 4 acres (16,207 sq.m.), this place has murals made of bronze.

Pratibimb Sthal

Pratibimb Sthal is the main entrance to the memorial guarded by statues of 62 elephants either side.

Dr. Bhimrao Ambedkar Memorial Drashya Sthal
Constructed on an 80-foot pyramid type structure on the back of Pratibimb Sthal, the Drashya Sthal offers a vantage point from where the park, shrines, structures and sites integrate as a view of the whole area. The flow of water from the top of the pyramid entertains visitors.

Vandalism
On 26 July 2012 a statue in the park was damaged by members of a group calling themselves "Uttar Pradesh Nav Nirman Sena". A replacement statue was re-installed overnight by the Lucknow city administration. Allegedly, the vandalism occured due to Amravati's waste of money on making of elephant statues. Ref

Film shooting
In the Bollywood film Youngistaan (2014) actors Jackky Bhagnani and Neha Sharma shot in Ambedkar Memorial Park and were surprised with its vast scale. After permission for shooting outside the memorial in March 2014, Aditya Roy Kapur and Parineeti Chopra shot for "Rangreli" song of film Daawat-e-Ishq. In November 2015, Ravi Kishan shot for a Bhojpuri film at Ambedkar Memorial Park. In February 2016, Mika Singh and Urvashi Rautela also shot for their new music video named Lal Dupatta Kurta Chikan Ka just outside the Memorial In 2017, the song "Jogi" from the movie Shaadi Mein Zaroor Aana, starring Rajkumar Rao and Kriti Kharbanda was shot here. In 2017 small part of Movie Bareilly Ki Barfi starring Ayushman Khurrana, Rajkummar Rao and Kriti Sanon was also shot here.

Legal issues
Since 2009 the memorial has been involved in a legal battle. In June 2009 the Supreme Court issued a stay against further building on the project, until the Public Interest Litigation (PLI) questioning these expenditure was settled. Despite initially denying even maintenance costs, in December 2010, the Uttar Pradesh government received permission to perform maintenance and completion of the park.

On 2018, the Allahabad High Court asked the Uttar Pradesh government to provide the status report on the vigilance department's investigation in connection with the alleged Rs 1,410 crore memorial scam involving this monument.

Gallery

See also 
 Statue of Equality
 Statue of Unity

References

External links

 Ambedkar Memorial, Gomti Nagar @ Wikimapia
 Photos of Ambedkar Udyan Memorial, Lucknow, Uttar Pradesh @ panoramia
 The saga of Ambedkar memorial, The Times of India, TNN, 21 June 2002, 12.36 am IST
 Thousands throng Ambedkar Memorial, Indian Express, Express News Service, Mon 7 December 2009, 01:47 hrs

Dalit monuments
Bahujan Samaj Party
Buildings and structures in Lucknow
Monuments and memorials in Uttar Pradesh
Memorials to B. R. Ambedkar
Gardens in Lucknow
2008 establishments in Uttar Pradesh
Buildings and structures completed in 2008
Statues of B. R. Ambedkar
Memorial parks
Sculpture gardens, trails and parks in India